Ocholi Abel Edicha  (born 10 May 1979) is a Nigerian badminton player. He was the men's singles gold medalist at the 2003 All-Africa Games, also in the mixed team event in 2007. He competed at the 2002 and 2010 Commonwealth Games.

Edicha started his career in badminton at the young age. With the support from his father, he joined Enugu Sports Council. He was recruited by Nigerian Army in 1996, spent for 23 years. He stopped playing for his country after the 2010 New Delhi Commonwealth Games.

Achievements

All-Africa Games 
Men's singles

Men's doubles

African Championships 
Men's doubles

Mixed doubles

BWF International Challenge/Series 
Men's doubles

  BWF International Challenge tournament
  BWF International Series tournament
  BWF Future Series tournament

References

External links 
 

1979 births
Living people
People from Kaduna State
Nigerian male badminton players
Badminton players at the 2002 Commonwealth Games
Badminton players at the 2010 Commonwealth Games
Commonwealth Games competitors for Nigeria
Competitors at the 2003 All-Africa Games
Competitors at the 2007 All-Africa Games
African Games gold medalists for Nigeria
African Games silver medalists for Nigeria
African Games bronze medalists for Nigeria
African Games medalists in badminton
21st-century Nigerian people